Michele Vano (born 5 October 1991) is an Italian professional footballer who plays as a forward for  club Rimini on loan from Perugia.

Club career
Vano spent the first eight seasons of his career in the fourth and fifth tier teams (Serie D and Eccellenza).

On 15 July 2017, he joined Arzachena, which was just promoted into the third-tier Serie C. He made his Serie C debut for Arzachena on 3 September 2017 in a game against Viterbese. He came on as a substitute in 28th minute for Giancarlo Lisai and scored his first goal on fully professional level just four minutes later.

On 19 June 2018, he went up another level, joining Serie B club Carpi on a three-year contract.

On 5 October 2020, Carpi sold his rights to Hellas Verona, who immediately loaned him to Mantova.

On 5 January 2021, he moved to Perugia on loan with a conditional obligation to buy. The condition for the purchase obligation was fulfilled and Perugia purchased his rights.

On 28 August 2021 he joined Pistoiese on loan from Perugia. On 27 August 2022, Vano was loaned to Rimini.

Honours

Individual
2019–20 Coppa Italia Top goal scorers: four goals, shared with Gianluca Scamacca

References

External links
 

1991 births
Living people
Footballers from Rome
Italian footballers
Association football forwards
Serie B players
Serie C players
Serie D players
Eccellenza players
A.S.D. Astrea players
Isernia F.C. players
S.S. Chieti Calcio players
Arzachena Academy Costa Smeralda players
A.C. Carpi players
Hellas Verona F.C. players
Mantova 1911 players
A.C. Perugia Calcio players
U.S. Pistoiese 1921 players
Rimini F.C. 1912 players